Binghampton may refer to various places, including:

Binghampton, Illinois, an unincorporated community, United States
Binghampton, Memphis, Tennessee, a Memphis neighborhood, United States
Binghampton Township, Barnes County, North Dakota, United States

See also
Binghamton (disambiguation)